A fixed tax is a lump sum tax that is not measured as a percentage of the tax base (income, wealth, or consumption).  Fixed taxes like a poll tax or sin tax are often considered regressive, but could have progressive effects if applied to luxury goods and services.

Since citizens share common roads, military protection, policing, and other government services, some argue that citizens should pay the same amount for basic infrastructure. Fixed taxation removes the moral dilemma of two individuals having to pay significantly different amounts in order to receive the same services, which could be argued as discrimination against economic success.

It is argued that a fixed tax can save on tax compliance costs and improves privacy. Unlike proportional taxes, a fixed tax does not necessitate public insight, i.e. governments would not need to know individual income, wealth, or consumption.

However, when applied as a precondition of membership in society or on products bought by the poor, it functions as a potentially extreme regressive tax in that it doesn't consider a person's ability to pay unless further adjustments are made (e.g. the way that the Australian HECS system applies tertiary education charges from a fixed schedule, but defers payments according to people's ability to pay by piggybacking payments as a progressively based surcharge on income tax). This can result in the lower income taxpayers paying much higher proportions of their incomes on taxes, incomes that are less disposable in that they must also pay a larger percentage of their incomes on necessities. Because of this, fixed taxes are better suited to funding governments which are not responsible for providing very much for the citizens and therefore do not have much to pay for.

Personal taxes